The 2013 Judo Grand Prix Rijeka was held in Rijeka, Croatia from 14 to 15 September 2013.

Medal summary

Men's events

Women's events

Source Results

Medal table

References

External links
 

2013 IJF World Tour
2013 Judo Grand Prix
Grand Prix 2013
Judo
Judo
Judo